Wen Tian or Wentian or variation, may refer to:

Space station module
 Wentian module, a laboratory module for the Chinese Space Station

Places
 Wentian (town), Xinhua County, Hunan Province, People's Republic of China.

People
Given name Wen-Tian
Wentian Li, bioinformatician
 Liu Wentian, a contestant on 2016 Sing! China (season 1)
Zhang Wentian (1900-1976), General Secretary of the Central Committee of the Communist Party of China

Name TIAN, Wen
Lord Mengchang (died 279BCE), personal name Wen Tian

Fictional characters
Given name Wen-Tian
 Prince Wentian, a character from the 2002 Mandarin-language wuxia TV series ; Drunken Hero
 Nangong Wentian, a fictional character from the Hong Kong wuxia comic book 神兵玄奇; Weapons of the Gods (comics)
 Xiang Wentian, a character from the 1969 Jin Yong wuxia novel The Smiling, Proud Wanderer
 Xiang Wentian, a fictional character from the 1992 Hong Kong wuxia film Swordsman II

Name WEN, Tian
 Wen Tian, a character from the Tang Qi Gong Zi (唐七公子) 2012 novel (三生三世枕上书) Three Lives Three Worlds, The Pillow Book

See also
 Tian Wen (disambiguation)
 Tianwen (disambiguation)
 Tian (disambiguation)
 Wen (disambiguation)